In mathematics, an explicit reciprocity law is a formula for the Hilbert symbol of a local field. The name "explicit reciprocity law" refers to the fact that the Hilbert symbols of local fields appear in Hilbert's reciprocity law for the power residue symbol. The definitions of the Hilbert symbol are usually rather roundabout and can be hard to use directly in explicit examples, and the explicit reciprocity laws give more explicit expressions for the Hilbert symbol that are sometimes easier to use.

There are also several explicit reciprocity laws for various generalizations of the Hilbert symbol to higher local fields, p-divisible groups, and so on.

History
 gave an explicit formula for the Hilbert symbol for odd prime powers for general local fields.

Examples

For archimedean local fields or in the unramified case the Hilbert symbol is easy to write down explicitly. The main problem is to evaluate it in the ramified case.

Archimedean fields

Over the complex numbers (a, b) is always 1.

Unramified case: the tame Hilbert symbol
In the unramified case, when the order of the Hilbert symbol is coprime to the residue characteristic of the local field, the tame Hilbert symbol is given by

where ω(a) is the (q – 1)-th root of unity congruent to a and ord(a) is the value of the valuation of the local field, and n is the degree of the Hilbert symbol, and q is the order of the residue class field. The number n divides q – 1 because the local field contains the nth roots of unity by assumption.

, where 

and the expression involves two Legendre symbols.

Ramified case

The simplest example of a Hilbert symbol in the ramified case is the quadratic Hilbert symbol over the 2-adic integers.

, where  and

See also
 Rational reciprocity law

Notes

References

Further reading
 

Algebraic number theory